Invasion de la privacidad (Invasion of Privacy) is the third studio album recorded by Puerto Rican singer Eddie Santiago released in 1988. The album became his third number-one album on the Billboard Tropical Albums chart.

Track listing
This information adapted from CD Universe.

Chart performance

See also
List of number-one Billboard Tropical Albums from the 1980s

References

1988 albums
Eddie Santiago albums